The 2021 All-Ireland Senior Football Championship was the 134th edition of the Gaelic Athletic Association's premier inter-county Gaelic football tournament since its establishment in 1887.

Thirty one of the thirty two Irish counties took part – Kilkenny did not compete. London and New York were withdrawn as a result of the public health restrictions imposed due to the COVID-19 pandemic.

Most division three and four teams who did not reach their provincial final were scheduled to compete in the 2021 Tailteann Cup. In previous years, they would have competed in the All-Ireland qualifiers. The introduction of the Tailteann Cup competition was postponed until 2022 (having been originally postponed from 2020).

There was no "Super 8" group stage (officially the all-Ireland quarter-final group stage). The four provincial winners advanced to the All-Ireland semi-finals which were played as single knockout games.

Dublin were the six-time defending champions, and were seeking to claim an unprecedented seventh consecutive title. Having won the Leinster championship, they were defeated by Mayo in the All-Ireland semi-finals.

The All-Ireland final was played on 11 September 2021 at Croke Park in Dublin, between Tyrone and Mayo, in what was their first ever meeting in a final. Tyrone won their 4th title after a 2–14 to 0–15 win against Mayo. Mayo lost their 11th consecutive final since 1989, losing 6 finals in 9 years, with this latest defeat on an identical scoreline to 2020, when Mayo lost to Dublin.

Competition format

Provincial Championships format
Connacht, Leinster, Munster and Ulster each organise a provincial championship. These tournaments are all straight knockout.

The draws took place on 19 April 2021 for the Connacht and Munster championships, and on 20 April 2021 for the Leinster and Ulster championships.

Qualifiers (cancelled)
Due to the COVID-19 pandemic, the qualifiers and Super 8s (officially the All-Ireland quarter final group stage) were cancelled. Teams were eliminated following their first defeat.

It was planned to limit the qualifiers to mainly teams in the top two divisions of the National Football League but, due to the restricted season as a result of the COVID-19 health measures, the qualifiers and Super 8s were cancelled in their entirety.

All-Ireland format
The four provincial champions play in two semi-finals. All matches are knock-out. Any game that ends in a draw will go straight to extra-time. If the sides are level after extra-time the game will be decided by a penalty shootout.

Rule changes since 2020 championship

 A penalty will be awarded for a 'cynical' foul that prevents a goal-scoring opportunity and occurs inside the twenty metre line or inside the semi-circular arc that extends from the centre of the twenty metre line. The player who committed the foul will receive a black card (and if they have previously received a yellow or black card, they will also receive a red card).
 The existing advantage rule was modified and implemented in the 2021 National Football League. Advantage is now only allowed to a player who has been fouled in two circumstances – 1) he has a goal-scoring opportunity 2) he has an opportunity to "create or avail of time and space" on the ball. Following its introduction, referees awarded fouls earlier where previously they would have allowed play to continue and this led to complaints that the flow of the game was being disrupted.
 The maor foirne (assistant manager) is not allowed to enter the field of play.
 Only one person is allowed to receive the trophy during the presentation to the winners.

Symbols
f = free, m = mark, '45 = score direct from a '45, HT = Half time, AET = After extra time

Provincial championships

Connacht Senior Football Championship

London and New York were withdrawn from the 2020 and 2021 Connacht championships due to international travel restrictions imposed due to the COVID-19 pandemic. But both are back in the 2022 season.

There was a full open draw for first time in over 40 years. It took place on 19 April 2021.

Leinster Senior Football Championship

Dublin, Kildare, Laois and Meath received byes to the quarter-final stage because they reached the semi-final stage in 2020. There was a separate draw after the quarter-finals to determine the semi-final pairings.

The draw for round 1 and the quarter-finals took place on 20 April 2021. The semi-final draw took place on 4 July after the quarter-finals.

Munster Senior Football Championship

There was a return of a straight forward open draw for the first time since 2013. Tipperary won the title in 2020. Cork and Kerry met in the Semi Final last year, meaning Cork, Kerry or Tipperary were not permitted to be drawn together in the quarter-finals. The draw was held on 19 April 2021.

Ulster Senior Football Championship

An open draw was held on 20 April 2021 with the provision that Cavan, Derry, Monaghan and Tyrone cannot be placed in the preliminary round.

All-Ireland Series

Bracket

Semi-finals

Final

Stadia and locations

Championship statistics
All scores correct as of 13 September 2021

Top scorer: overall

Top scorer: single game

Scoring events
All records exclude extra time.
Widest winning margin: 24 points
 Mayo 5–20 – 0–11 Leitrim (Connacht SFC)
Most goals in a match: 6
Monaghan 4–17 – 2–21 Armagh (Ulster SFC)
Most points in a match: 38
Longford 0–25 – 2–13 Carlow (Leinster SFC)
Monaghan 4–17 – 2–21 Armagh (Ulster SFC)
Most goals by one team in a match: 5
 Mayo 5–20 – 0–11 Leitrim (Connacht SFC)
 Highest aggregate score: 56 points
Monaghan 4–17 – 2–21 Armagh (Ulster SFC)
Lowest aggregate score: 22 points
Dublin 0–15 – 0–7 Wexford (Leinster SFC)

Miscellaneous
Leitrim's 24-point loss to Mayo was their joint-biggest championship defeat, equalling a 1973 match, also against Mayo, that ended 7–6 to 0–3.
COVID-19 caused the Connacht final and Ulster Final to move from MacHale Park, Castlebar or St Tiernach's Park, Clones to Croke Park, Dublin for first time since 1922 for Connacht and 2006 for Ulster. Sligo do return to Connacht championship. The return of London and New York to the Connacht championship was postponed until 2022.
Dublin's extended winning record gives them 11 Leinster titles in a row.
Dublin's record-breaking unbeaten streak of 45 consecutive championship games (42 wins, 3 draws) was ended by Mayo in the All Ireland semi-final. Their previous championship defeat was back in 2014, against Donegal. Dublin's unprecedented title streak (a six-in-a-row, 2015–20), came to an end also.

Awards

The Sunday Game Team of the Year
The Sunday Game team of the year was picked on 11 September, the night of the final. Kieran McGeary was chosen as the Footballer of the Year by the RTÉ panel.

All Star Team of the Year
The All Star Team of the Year team of the year was picked on 10 December.
Kieran McGeary was named as the All Stars Footballer of the Year with Mayo's Oisín Mullin picked as the All Stars Young Footballer of the Year.

 Player has previously been selected.

Notes

References

External links
GAA official website
GAA 2021 Master Fixture

 
All-Ireland Championship